Netan can refer to:
 Cyber Terror Response Center in Korea
 Netan, a fictional character in Stargate SG-1